The Fiat Tempra (Type 159) is a small family car produced by the Italian automaker Fiat from 1990 to 1996 in Italy. The Tempra was intended as a replacement for the Fiat Regata. The original project was called Tipo 3, being a mid size car between the Fiat Tipo (project Tipo 2) and the bigger Fiat Croma (project Tipo 4). The Tempra shares its Type Three platform with the Lancia Dedra and Alfa Romeo 155.

The Tempra was named the 1991 Semperit Irish Car of the Year in Ireland. In Brazil, the Tempra was built from 1991 to 1998. The car was also assembled in Turkey by Tofaş and in Vietnam by Mekong Auto in complete knock down until 2000.

Overview
The saloon of the Tempra was shown for the first time in newspapers in November 1989, and introduced in February 1990 at the Geneva Motor Show, with the station wagon (marketed as the "Tempra SW") arriving two months later in Turin. The initial engine range comprised 1.4, 1.6 and 1.8 petrol units and normally aspirated and turbocharged 1.9 litre diesel units.

The car began to be produced in Brazil for Latin American markets, after being introduced in Aruba, September 1991. First seen in September 1992, a two door coupé version of it, was produced exclusively for the market in Brazil. It was built until 1995, and an turbocharged petrol version was also available there.

Mechanics

The Tempra's engine range was similar to that of the Tipo. Initially 1.4  and 1.6 litre models had carburettor engines. Both of these models were discontinued in 1992, due to the new European emission standards, and thus all models from 1992 on had catalytic converters and electronic injection.

Transmission was a standard five speed manual, but for the first time a midsize sedan was offered as with a continuously variable transmission which was previously available on the Fiat Uno, Panda, Ritmo and Tipo.

This, called the "Selecta", was available only with the 1.6 litre engine with either bodystyle. As of July 1991, the 2.0 litre SX model became available with an optional four speed automatic transmission.

Presented in Geneva 1992 (March), there was a version of the station wagon which offered the two litre engine, combined with permanent four wheel drive. The four wheel drive version had a slight front bias (56/44%).

During its six year production run, few changes were made apart from a minor facelift in April 1993, which resulted in a new front grille and other minor styling changes, as well as new equipment levels.

Main parts (most notably, the doors) were shared with the Fiat Tipo. Other vehicles, derived from the same chassis were Lancia Dedra (Tempra's most similar cousin, sharing all mechanical components) and  Alfa Romeo 155.

The Fiat Tempra had two exclusive options in Brazil: two door version for any engine option (from 1992 to 1994), and a 2.0 litre turbo, which was sold with the two door as "Tempra Turbo" (1994 to 1995) and with the four door as "Tempra Turbo Stile" (1996 to 1997). 

As remark, the Tempra Turbo 1994 was the second turbocharged car to be produced in Brazil. The first one was the Uno Turbo, also in 1994.

Equipment and trim levels

Only two trim levels were available in its early years: standard (S) and SX, both reasonably equipped considering the Tempra's low price.

SX models for example, featured power windows, power locks, adjustable belts and steering wheel, front fog lights, body coloured bumpers, velvet upholstery, a futuristic digital dashboard and many other standard extras. They were also available with optional extras like anti lock brakes, alloy wheels, sunroof, electronic climate control, etc.

A facelift in April 1993 featured more trim levels, now ranging from the standard models ("L" in the United Kingdom, where it was only available with 1.4 engine) via the S and SX to the top SLX, which was only available with 1.8, and 2.0 litre engines in the United Kingdom. An optional driver's airbag was another innovation that year.

The four wheel drive Station Wagons continued to be available in some markets, such as Switzerland.

In Turkey, where Tofaş built the car, there were also "SX A" and "SX AK" (climate control added) versions available. The 1,000,000th Tofaş built was a Tempra 2.0 i.e. 16V. The Turkish 16 valve Tempra was not sold in the rest of Europe; it was also available with station wagon bodywork and has a  engine.

There was also the domestic market Marengo, a name also used before with the Regata Weekend and later again with the Marea Wagon. This is a commercial version of the Tempra which was based on the Station Wagon version, but with basic equipment, heavily tinted rear windows, and no rear seats. The engines were most commonly the naturally aspirated diesels.

Reports

Quattroruote, a popular Italian motoring magazine, reported some failures and defects with the Tempra. The first issue to be reported was some water ingress through the windscreen seals, an issue that previously plagued some other Fiat vehicles, especially Alfa 33, which in rainy conditions would carry a significant quantity of water on board. 

This problem was reported from 1990–92, and was resolved with using a higher quantity of sealant when fitting the glass.

Another reported problem was a high oil consumption, especially the 1,581 cc engine, which was a common defect with Tipo (with the same engine) and Panda (1000 FIRE engine). The same was reported for other Fiat's vehicles, but disappeared with the new 1.6 L 66 kW engine.

On the same model, from 1994, the car started to show some electronic malfunctions, with items such as the electronic control unit, code key and electric system. A design flaw of the Tempra was that its rear window was too small and inclined and the tail too tall, so that rear visibility was poor. This issue was common with the 155 and Dedra, and was one of the reason the estate had more success than the saloon, especially in the United Kingdom.

Qualities

Another advantage was the galvanized structure, which allowed the model to be resistant against rust over the time, also showing a good response to weather and bad climate conditions after many years. Other qualities were the strength and reliability of the mechanics, thanks to the engine that could be used in urban drive, extra urban and highways.

For its luggage capacity, especially the Marengo version, was also one of the favourites among companies with the 1929 cc diesel engine, and the interior space was comfortable for five persons during long travels.

F1 Safety Car

End of production
The Tempra was discontinued in Europe in August 1996, and in Brazil in 1998. It was replaced by the Fiat Marea, which is based on the Fiat Bravo and Fiat Brava platform, the replacements for the Tempra's sister car the Fiat Tipo. In Brazil, 204,795 Tempras were produced in eight years, and in Turkey, where the car was manufactured by Tofaş from November 1990 until 1999, 129,590 were made.

Engines

Notes

External links

Tempra
Mid-size cars
Front-wheel-drive vehicles
All-wheel-drive vehicles
Sedans
Station wagons
Cars introduced in 1990
Vehicles with CVT transmission
Cars of Turkey
Cars of Brazil
Cars discontinued in 2002